WZFX (99.1 FM) is an urban contemporary formatted broadcast radio station licensed to Whiteville, North Carolina and located in Fayetteville, North Carolina.  WZFX broadcasts under the branding "Foxy 99." WZFX is owned and operated by Beasley Media Group.  Its studios are located east of downtown Fayetteville, and its transmitter is located in Tar Heel, North Carolina.

As of the fall 2021 ratings period, WZFX has the highest ratings of any radio station in the Fayetteville market.

WENC/WQTR
99.1 FM first signed on as WENC FM in 1978 with its license in the city of Whiteville. It is believed the frequency signed on with 5,000 watts at this time.

WZFX
In March 1986, WQTR-FM increased its power to 100,000 watts and changed to WZFX, and become "The All New FM 99 The Fox, WZFX". The station has a Rhythmic Top-40 format. The new owners were Steve Weil of Goldsboro, North Carolina, his brother Henry Weil, and his sister Leslie Weil.

The Fox to Foxy 99
In 1987, WZFX evolved into an Urban/CHR a.k.a. CHUrban format playing such artist as New Edition, Lillo Thomas, Force MD's and Troop. WZFX changed its moniker to "99.1 the Fox"; however, in 1995 brought back the "Original Foxy 99" and broadcast its 100,000-watt signal on the air "From the Capital City to the Coast". WZFX is the sister station of WIKS in Jacksonville, North Carolina, which also has a similar format and signal power of 100,000 watts.

In 1990, after WQSM stopped playing top 40, WZFX added some top 40 hits to its music mix. This move took "The Fox" back to the top of the ratings.
In 1994, WZFX moved from the Wachovia building to a former Cato department store, which the owners purchased.

In 1995, Atlantic Broadcasting Group sold WROV-FM to Ray Thomas of Roanoke, Virginia and WLNI in Lynchburg, Virginia, leaving the company with only WZFX. Several DJs and general manager Lynn Carraway were let go. At the time, WZFX played no rap until after 5 in the afternoon, and rap-leaning WLRD was doing very well despite its limited signal.

In 1997, Beasley Broadcasting—owner of WKML, WTSB, WAZZ and WEWO—bought WZFX from Joyner Communications. There was talk in 1996 of another company buying WZFX and WLRD, but that deal fell apart. Later in the year, Beasley also bought WLRD and WYRU. For a short time, WLRD aired the programming of WZFX.

Interference issues northwest of Fayetteville
WZFX's signal north of Carthage, Moore County begins to see significant interference from WSLQ-FM out of Roanoke, Virginia. This is also the case in southern Chatham County, much of Montgomery and Randolph Counties and nearly all of Wake County. Under ideal atmospheric conditions, WZFX can be received with little to no interference from WSLQ as far north as Burlington, Greensboro, High Point, Hillsborough and Durham.
 
Kenny J is the current program urban brand director for WZFX (Foxy 99). Babydoll is the host of the Dollhouse during mid-day. She does the Midday Party Mix every Monday, Wednesday, and Friday at 12pm (EST). G-Moniy is the afternoon drive host and holds the 5 O’Clock Takeova every Monday thru Friday at 5pm (EST). Kent Dunn is the Market Manager for WZFX (Foxy 99).

References

External links
Official Website

ZFX
Urban contemporary radio stations in the United States
ZFX